= De Carthage à Carthage =

2009 film

- Directed by: Khaled Barsaoui
- Produced by: West side movie
- Cinematography: Taieb Ben Ameur
- Edited by: Fakhreddine Amri Mahdi M. Barsaoui
- Release date: 2009
- Running time: 26 minutes
- Country: Tunisia

De Carthage à Carthage is a Tunisian 2009 documentary film.

== Synopsis ==
Khaled Barsaoui's documentary on the Carthage Cinema Days asks questions about the future of the Festival and the definition of its identity.
